Richard Paul Keirn (29 July 1924 – 22 May 2000) was a Colonel and fighter pilot in the United States Air Force. He was one of two United States service members to be a prisoner of war (POW) in both World War II and the Vietnam War and was the first US airman to be shot down by a Surface-to-air missile (SAM) during the Vietnam War.

Early life
Keirn was born on 29 July 1924 in Akron, Ohio.

Air Force career
While serving as a USAAF flight officer during World War II, his B-17 was shot down on his first mission and he was held as a POW in Nazi Germany from 11 September 1944 to 5 May 1945.

Following World War II he served in the Ohio Air National Guard 164th Fighter Interceptor Squadron before returning to the active Air Force in December 1956.

Captain Keirn volunteered for duty in Vietnam and in July 1965 deployed with the 47th Tactical Fighter Squadron to Ubon Royal Thai Air Force Base, Thailand.

Keirn ejected successfully from his stricken aircraft and was captured. His bombardier/navigator Captain Roscoe H. Fobair failed to eject and was killed, his remains were recovered in 2001. During his captivity, Keirn was one of 52 Americans forced to participate in the Hanoi March, a propaganda event held in July 1966 in which U.S. POWs were marched through the streets of Hanoi and brutally beaten by North Vietnamese civilians. He was released on 12 February 1973 as a part of Operation Homecoming.

Upon return to the United States, Keirn returned to flying status with the Air Force, flying both the O-2 Skymaster, and RF-4C Phantom II, and served as Assistant Director and as Director of Operational Services, Deputy Chief of Staff, Operations, Headquarters Ninth Air Force, Shaw Air Force Base, South Carolina, from 23 April 1975 to 30 June 1976.

Military awards and decorations
Colonel Keirn's major military awards and decorations include:

Silver Star citation

Lieutenant Colonel Richard P. Keirn
U.S. Air Force
Prisoner of War (North Vietnam) 
Date of Action: August 15 - November 15, 1967
 The President of the United States of America, authorized by Act of Congress, July 8, 1918 (amended by act of July 25, 1963), takes pleasure in presenting the Silver Star to Lieutenant Colonel Richard P. Keirn, United States Air Force, for gallantry and intrepidity in action in connection with military operations against an opposing armed force during August 1967, while a Prisoner of War in North Vietnam. Ignoring international agreements on treatment of prisoners of war, the enemy resorted to mental and physical cruelties to obtain information, confessions, and propaganda materials. Lieutenant Colonel Keirn resisted their demands by calling upon his deepest inner strengths in a manner which reflected his devotion to duty and great credit upon himself and the United States Air Force.

Family
Keirn was married with a son, professional wrestler Steve Keirn and a daughter.

References

1924 births
2000 deaths
United States Air Force personnel of the Vietnam War
American prisoners of war in World War II
Aviators from Ohio
People from Akron, Ohio
Recipients of the Air Medal
Recipients of the Distinguished Flying Cross (United States)
Recipients of the Legion of Merit
Recipients of the Silver Star
Shot-down aviators
Vietnam War prisoners of war
United States Air Force colonels
World War II prisoners of war held by Germany
Recipients of the Croix de Guerre 1939–1945 (France)